The Rough Fell is an upland breed of sheep, originating in England. It is common on fell and moorland farms, its distribution embracing a large proportion of South Cumbria, parts of the West Riding of Yorkshire, North Lancashire and, more recently, upland parts of Devon. It is very hardy and, as its name suggests, has proved to be well-suited to endure the hardships of exposed and high moorland and mountains. It is one of the largest mountain breeds in Britain.  This breed is raised primarily for meat.

The hardy constitution enables a ewe to mother and rear her lambs whilst feeding mainly on the poor upland grasses and heathers found on her native moorland. Because of the type of fleece, the breed requires no housing, even in the most inclement weather.

Rough Fell sheep can be recognised for the broad white patch across their black faces, and both rams and ewes are horned. They are mostly used by farmers on their native fell farms for pure breeding, but many are used for crossing with other breeds, contributing their hardiness and adaptation to upland conditions.

Mature ewes weighs 50 kg (110 lbs) on average and rams 80 kg (176 lbs).

References

External links
 The Rough Fell Sheep Breeders' Association – UK

twitterfeed @roughfellsheep
Facebook roughfell sheep

Sheep breeds originating in England
Sheep breeds